Dimitrios Antoniadis (born 29 July 1992) is a Greek cyclist. He rode at the cross-country event at the 2016 Summer Olympics. He finished in 31st place with a time of 1:44:17.

Major results

2012
 1st  Cross-country, Balkan Championships
 2nd Cross-country, National Championships
2013
 1st  Cross-country, Balkan Championships
2014
 1st  Cross-country, Balkan Championships
 2nd Cross-country, National Championships
2015
 1st  Cross-country, National Championships
2016
 1st  Cross-country, Balkan Championships
 1st  Cross-country, National Championships
2017
 1st  Cross-country, National Championships
2018
 1st  Cross-country, National Championships

Cyclo-cross
2018-2019
 1st  National Championships

References

1992 births
Living people
Greek male cyclists
Cyclists at the 2016 Summer Olympics
Olympic cyclists of Greece
Cyclists at the 2015 European Games
European Games competitors for Greece
Sportspeople from Thessaloniki
21st-century Greek people